Ximing Temple was a famous temple in Chang'an, the capital of the Tang dynasty in Chinese history. Chang'an, current day Xi'an, was the eastern terminus of the Silk Road, and a cosmopolitan metropolis. Ximing was established by Tang Gaozong in 656. It was at Ximing that pilgrim and traveller Xuanzang (602-664) had translated the scriptures he had brought back from India. Another traveller Yijing (635-713) also based himself at Ximing while working on translations of Indian scriptures. Indian scholar monk Shubhākarasimha, was responsible for the introduction of the Mahavairocana Sutra and the tantric traditions associated with it. Japanese monk, Kukai studied Sanskrit there under the tutelage of Gandharan pandit Prajñā (734-810?) who had been educated at the Indian Buddhist university at Nalanda.  Ximing was celebrated for its library which was the most comprehensive library of Buddhist texts in China at the time. Woncheuk (613–696) (Chinese Yuáncè) was a Korean Buddhist monk, also known as Ximing Fashi after the name of this temple where he did most of his important work.

References

Buildings and structures in Xi'an
Buddhist temples in Xi'an
Archaeological sites in China